Ossu is

 Ossu (East Timor), a village and subdistrict in East Timor.
 Õssu, a village in Estonia.